Tanca is a sixth-century French Roman Catholic saint

Tanca may also refer to:

 People
 Andrew Tanca
 Juan Tanca Marengo, Ecuadorian physician

 Places
 Tanča Gora
 Tanca Marchese
 Tanca Tanca

See also 
 Tanka (disambiguation)